The 2015 RA Africa Cup Sevens is an Olympic qualification tournament for rugby sevens at the 2016 Summer Olympics held in Kempton Park, Gauteng, South Africa on 14–15 November 2015. It was the 3rd championship in a series that began in 2013.

The tournament will have the top team qualify directly to the Olympics, and the second, third, and fourth place teams qualify for the 2016 Men's Rugby Sevens Final Olympic Qualification Tournament.

North Qualifying 
Note: Cameroon was scheduled to compete, but was unable to attend. Morocco took their spot in the competition.

Pool Stage

Pool A

Pool B

Knockout stage

Bowl

Plate

Cup

Final North Qualifying standings

South Qualifying 
Note: Zambia has already qualified for the 2015 Rugby Africa Men's Sevens Championships after receiving the 8th Qualification spot with South Africa qualifying directly to the Olympics and no longer participating in the Championships

Pool Stage

Pool A

Pool B

Knockout stage

Bowl

Plate

Cup

Final South Qualifying standings

Final Tournament

Teams 

 (North Qualifier)
 (North Qualifier)
 (South Qualifier)
 (South Qualifier)

South Africa already qualified for the Olympics by finishing 2nd in 2014–15 Sevens World Series. Zambia was then given the final spot by finishing the previous tournament in 9th place

Pool Stage 
Teams ranked 1-8 qualify for Cup Quarterfinals.

All times SAST (UTC+2)

Pool A

Pool B

Pool C

Placement Stage

Final Tournament Bowl

Final Tournament Plate

Semi Final Matches

Seventh Place Match

Plate Final Match

Final Tournament Cup

Quarter Final Matches

Semi Final Matches

Third Place Match

Final Match

Final standings

See also
 2015 Rugby Africa Women's Sevens Championships

References

2015
Rugby sevens at the 2016 Summer Olympics – Men's tournament
2015 rugby sevens competitions
International rugby union competitions hosted by South Africa
2015 in South African rugby union
2015 in African rugby union
Rugby sevens competitions in South Africa